Jena Rose Raphael (born January 12, 2001), known professionally as Jena Rose, is an American pop singer-songwriter from Plano, Texas. She has had two songs enter the Billboard Dance Club Songs chart, and released her debut EP, Reasons, on March 30, 2018.

Early life 
Jena Rose was enrolled in piano lessons at age five. She started taking singing lessons and writing songs at age 9. By 12, she performed at venues around the Dallas area and won numerous awards during this period in her age group, such as Overall Best Musician twice from Septien Entertainment Group Commercial Artist Showcase, and once from the 2013 Master Showcase.

Career 
Rose had her first single in 2015, when Rose was 14, with her song "Take a Breath". Her first successes on the pop charts took place in 2017 with her single "Sweet Love". "Sweet Love" was remixed by a number of DJs, and these remixes were commercially released as an EP titled Sweet Love – The Remixes. The remixes spent 11 weeks on Billboards Dance Club Songs chart, rising to no. 18. Rose has recorded songs with other artists, including "Crazy" featuring Sean Kingston and an acoustic version of "Sweet Love" with Tanner Patrick.

She released her debut EP, Reasons, in March 2018. Rose wrote all of its songs and it was produced by Drew Scott. The lead single "Reasons" premiered on Billboard. Remixes of this single were commercially released as an EP titled Reasons – The Remixes the following month. The remixes of "Reasons" were added to the Billboard Dance Club Chart in their debut week, and the song went on to reach no. 14 on the chart and spent 12 weeks on the charts. The second single, "Lost at Sea", reached no. 18 on the charts in November 2018.

Discography

Singles

References

Articles with topics of unclear notability from September 2017
All articles with topics of unclear notability
Living people
2001 births